Fridell is a surname. Notable people with the surname include:

Ake Fridell (1919–1985), Swedish film actor
Daniel Fridell (born 1967), Swedish film director and producer
Folke Fridell (1904–1985), Swedish writer
Squire Fridell (born 1943), American retired actor, author, and winemaker
Lorie Fridell, American criminologist
Vivian Fridell (1912/1943 - 1998), American actress